David Madden may refer to:
David Madden (novelist) (born 1933), American novelist
David Madden (musician) (born 1943), Jamaican reggae trumpeter / singer / songwriter
David Madden (entrepreneur), Australian entrepreneur associated with progressive causes
David M. Madden, former mayor of Weymouth, Massachusetts
Dave Madden (1931–2014), Canadian actor
David Madden (politician) (1880–1955), Irish Fine Gael politician from Limerick
David Madden (footballer) (born 1963), retired professional footballer
David Madden (Jeopardy! contestant) (born 1981), American game show contestant and academic competition organizer
David Madden (executive), American media producer and executive
Sir David Madden (diplomat), British diplomat, British Ambassador to Greece